Frédéric Benoît Victoire Jullien (13 April 1785 – 28 August 1825) was a French officer. Unlike his elder brothers, General Louis Joseph Victor Jullien de Bidon and Captain Thomas Prosper Jullien, he made his name under the Bourbon Restoration.

Early life 
Jullien was born on 13 April 1785 in the Comtat Venaissin enclave of the Papal States.

Military career 
In August 1807 he was made a lieutenant in Italy and on 8 May 1809 he fought in the Battle of Piave River. While crossing the river during the battle he received a sabre cut across his right cheek, stretching from his ear to his upper lip. In April 1809 the second Austrian campaign began and despite his wound, Jullien rejoined his unit in Germany that July. He was made a captain in the 28th Dragoon Regiment of the Grande Armée in August, at Graz in Styria. He fought in the campaigns in France from January to April 1814 during which Napoleon I of France failed to prevent the Allied invasion of France and hold onto the throne.

He ceased to serve in the imperial forces on 6 April 1814 after Napoleon's abdication. Under the Restoration which followed, he was made a captain of the Dragons de la Manche, before being made a Knight of the Order of St Louis on 18 December 1816. He was made a Knight of the Légion d'honneur on 18 December 1822 as lieutenant colonel of the 4e Régiment de la Gironde.

Death 
He died of several wounds at Lapalud on 28 August 1825. He had one son, Eugène-Frédéric Louis Marie-Victor de Jullien (16 December 1824 – 1836). His now-vanished tomb bore the inscription (translated into English):

References

1785 births
1825 deaths
French military personnel killed in the Napoleonic Wars
Chevaliers of the Légion d'honneur
People from Vaucluse